Super Mario Bros. is a 1985 platforming video game by Nintendo for the Nintendo Entertainment System.

Super Mario Bros. or New Super Mario Bros. may also refer to:
Super Mario series, a series of video games by Nintendo
Super Mario Bros. Deluxe, a 1999 game for the Game Boy Color
New Super Mario Bros., a 2006 game for the Nintendo DS
New Super Mario Bros. Wii, a 2009 game for the Wii and a follow-up to the 2006 game
New Super Mario Bros. 2, a 2012 game for the Nintendo 3DS and a follow-up to the 2009 game
New Super Mario Bros. U, a 2012 game for the Wii U, a sequel to the 2009 game, and a follow-up to the 3DS game
Super Mario Bros. 35, a 2020 battle royale video game using elements from the 1985 platforming game
Game & Watch: Super Mario Bros., a 2020 Super Mario Bros. re-release on a Game & Watch console
Mario and his younger twin Luigi, collectively known as the Super Mario Bros.
Super Mario Bros. (comic book)
Super Mario Bros.: The Great Mission to Rescue Princess Peach!, a 1986 Japanese anime film
Super Mario Bros. (film), a 1993 adventure movie loosely based on the video game
Super Mario Bros. theme, a theme originally found in the first stage of Super Mario Bros.
Super Mario Bros. 35th Anniversary, a celebration of the 35th anniversary of Super Mario Bros.
The Super Mario Bros. Movie, an upcoming animated film

See also
List of Mario television series
Mario Bros., a 1983 arcade game